Ičići (Italian: Icici) is a small place located in Croatia in the north-east part of Istria County. It is located at the foot of the mountain Učka, on the north part of the Adriatic Sea. It is joined to Opatija since 2006.

Tourism

   
T      

The town, which has around 800 regular residents, is known as a tourist resort.  It is situated on the Opatija Riviera, and is in close proximity to Opatija.  Tourism primarily focuses around the water, and the town has a large marina for hosting yachts, as well as a port for small boats.  The town also features accommodation (such as hotels, camping, apartments) and sports and recreational facilities (such as tennis courts, water sports, sailing). Nearby Opatija offers cultural and entertainment programs. ACI Marina has 300 berths and 35 dry berths. On the road from Icici to the Učka mountain you will find the small medieval town of Veprinac, whose city statute dates as far back as the year 1500.

External links

 More information about Icici and its offer
 More photos of Icici

Populated places in Primorje-Gorski Kotar County